Sore may refer to: 
 Ulcer (dermatology), a sore on the skin or a mucous membrane
 Sore, a mild pain or ache
 Sore (album), by Buzzov*en
 Sore (band), an Indonesian rock band
 Sore, Landes, a village in the Landes département of France
 Sore, a slang term for angry

See also
 Cold sore
 Sores, a surname